Equestrian at the 2010 Asian Games was held in Guangzhou Equestrian Venue, Conghua, Guangdong, China from 14 November to 24 November 2010.

There were three equestrian disciplines: dressage, eventing and jumping. All three disciplines were further divided into individual and team contests for a total of six events.

After the Games, Guangzhou Equestrian Venue was bought by Hong Kong Jockey Club, and rebuilt to create Conghua Racechouse.

Schedule

Medalists

Medal table

Participating nations
A total of 92 athletes from 16 nations competed in equestrian at the 2010 Asian Games:

References

Results at FEI website

External links
Official website 

 
2010
Equestrian
2010 in equestrian